Live at the Royal Albert Hall is a live album by Nick Cave and The Bad Seeds, released on 24 November 2008. It was recorded on 19 and 20 May 1997 during the tour for The Boatman's Call and eight of these tracks (plus a version of "The Weeping Song") were originally released as a nine-track bonus disc for The Best of Nick Cave and The Bad Seeds. It features a version of "Where the Wild Roses Grow" with vocals by Blixa Bargeld, which is delivered in a way that is similar to the demo version that can also be found on the B-Sides & Rarities three-disc set. These live recordings display the more mellow sound and performances that the group had been showcasing at that period, and would continue to deliver in the later No More Shall We Part.

Track listing
"Lime Tree Arbour" (Nick Cave) – 3:41
"Stranger than Kindness" (Anita Lane, Blixa Bargeld) – 5:03
"Red Right Hand" (Cave, Mick Harvey, Thomas Wydler) – 5:18
"I Let Love In" (Cave) – 4:12
"Brompton Oratory" (Cave) – 3:47
"Henry Lee" (Cave, Traditional) – 4:03
"The Ship Song" (Cave) – 4:15
"Where the Wild Roses Grow" (Cave) – 4:12
"People Ain't No Good" (Cave) – 6:11 †
"Do You Love Me?" (Cave, Martyn P. Casey) – 4:31 †
"Far From Me" (Cave) – 6:12 †
"The Mercy Seat" (Cave, Harvey) – 5:12 †

Tracks marked (†) were not included on The Best Of bonus disc.

Personnel
 Nick Cave - vocals
 Warren Ellis - violin
 Blixa Bargeld - guitars, vocals
 Mick Harvey - guitars, organ, vibraphone
 Conway Savage - piano, organ
 Martyn Casey - bass
 Thomas Wydler - drums
 Jim Sclavunos - percussion

References

Live albums recorded at the Royal Albert Hall
Nick Cave live albums
2008 live albums